The 1985–86 NHL season was the 69th season of the National Hockey League. This season saw the league's Board of Governors introduce the Presidents' Trophy, which would go to the team with the best overall record in the NHL regular season. The Edmonton Oilers would be the first winners of this award.

The Montreal Canadiens defeated the Calgary Flames four games to one in the final series to win the Stanley Cup.

League business
On June 13, 1985, the NHL board of governors voted 17–4 in favour of amending a penalty rule. Previously, coincidental minor penalties would result in 4-on-4 play. The amendment allowed teams to substitute another player to keep the play 5-on-5. It was seen by many as a shot at trying to slow down the high-flying Edmonton Oilers. Wayne Gretzky was quoted as saying, "I think the NHL is making a big mistake. I think the NHL should be more concerned with butt-ending, spearing, and three-hour hockey games than getting rid of 4-on-4 situations." It wasn't until 1992, with the Oiler dynasty (five cups in seven years) having ended, that the NHL reverted to the original 4-on-4 rules.

Regular season
The Edmonton Oilers once again regained control of top spot in the NHL and were awarded with the Presidents' Trophy—the first time the trophy had been awarded for the best record—while last year's best team, the Philadelphia Flyers slipped to second. The Flyers continued their dominance of the Wales Conference despite the death of their Vezina-winning goaltender, Pelle Lindbergh, in a car accident on November 11. Edmonton's Wayne Gretzky won his seventh straight Hart Memorial Trophy and his sixth straight Art Ross Trophy. This season saw Gretzky score 52 goals, and set records of 163 assists and 215 points. This was the fourth time in five years that Gretzky reached the 200 point plateau; no other player has reached 200 point mark, although Mario Lemieux would garner 199 points in 76 games in 1988–89. Edmonton's defenceman Paul Coffey broke Bobby Orr's record of 46 goals for most goals in a season by a defenceman by scoring 48 times.

Final standings
Note: GP = Games Played, W = Wins, L = Losses, T = Ties, GF= Goals For, GA = Goals Against, Pts = Points, PIM = Penalty Minutes

Prince of Wales Conference

Clarence Campbell Conference

Playoffs

The 1986 playoffs saw three first place teams eliminated in the opening round and the fourth, Edmonton, bowed out in the second.

The Montreal Canadiens decided to go with a rookie goaltender by the name of Patrick Roy. This decision proved to be a good one just like when the Canadiens rode rookie goalie Ken Dryden to a Stanley Cup championship in 1971. In the Final, the Canadiens beat the Calgary Flames, who were also riding a rookie netminder, Mike Vernon.  Patrick Roy won the Conn Smythe Trophy as the playoff MVP and had a sparkling 1.92 goals against average along with 15 wins.

The 1986 Stanley Cup playoffs are the last time to date that all active Canadian teams have qualified in the same season. It is also the second time that all seven active teams at the time qualified, the first occurring three years earlier. Also, the Hartford Whalers won their only playoff series during their tenure in Hartford against the Quebec Nordiques.

Playoff bracket

Stanley Cup Finals

After a 2-year trial of the 2–3–2 home ice format, the finals reverted to the 2–2–1–1–1 format.

Awards

All-Star teams

Player statistics

Scoring leaders

Source: NHL

Leading goaltenders 

Source: NHL

Coaches

Patrick Division
New Jersey Devils: Doug Carpenter
New York Islanders: Al Arbour
New York Rangers: Ted Sator
Philadelphia Flyers: Mike Keenan
Pittsburgh Penguins: Bob Berry
Washington Capitals: Bryan Murray

Adams Division
Boston Bruins: Butch Goring
Buffalo Sabres: Jim Schoenfeld and Scotty Bowman
Hartford Whalers: Jack Evans
Montreal Canadiens: Jean Perron
Quebec Nordiques: Michel Bergeron

Norris Division
Chicago Black Hawks: Bob Pulford
Detroit Red Wings: Harry Neale and Brad Park
Minnesota North Stars: Lorne Henning
St. Louis Blues: Jacques Demers
Toronto Maple Leafs: Dan Maloney

Smythe Division
Calgary Flames: Bob Johnson
Edmonton Oilers: Glen Sather
Los Angeles Kings: Pat Quinn
Vancouver Canucks: Tom Watt
Winnipeg Jets: Barry Long and John Ferguson, Sr.

Milestones

Debuts
The following is a list of players of note who played their first NHL game in 1985–86 (listed with their first team, asterisk(*) marks debut in playoffs):
Bill Ranford, Boston Bruins
Daren Puppa, Buffalo Sabres
Brian Bradley, Calgary Flames
Gary Suter, Calgary Flames
Brett Hull*, Calgary Flames
Adam Oates, Detroit Red Wings
Petr Klima, Detroit Red Wings
Bob Probert, Detroit Red Wings
Shayne Corson, Montreal Canadiens
Kirk McLean, New Jersey Devils
Craig Wolanin, New Jersey Devils
Scott Mellanby, Philadelphia Flyers
Craig Simpson, Pittsburgh Penguins
Jeff Brown, Quebec Nordiques
Cliff Ronning*, St. Louis Blues
Wendel Clark, Toronto Maple Leafs
Dave Lowry, Vancouver Canucks
Jim Sandlak, Vancouver Canucks

Last games
The following is a list of players of note that played their last game in the NHL in 1985–86 (listed with their last team):
Tom Lysiak, Chicago Black Hawks
Mike Rogers, Edmonton Oilers
Mario Tremblay, Montreal Canadiens
Bob Nystrom, New York Islanders
Pelle Lindbergh, Philadelphia Flyers
Denis Herron, Pittsburgh Penguins
Don Edwards, Toronto Maple Leafs
Marian Stastny, Toronto Maple Leafs
Jiri Bubla, Vancouver Canucks
Dan Bouchard, Winnipeg Jets

See also 
 List of Stanley Cup champions
 1985 NHL Entry Draft
 1985–86 NHL transactions
 38th National Hockey League All-Star Game
 National Hockey League All-Star Game
 NHL All-Rookie Team
 1985 in sports
 1986 in sports

References
 
 
 
 
Notes

External links
Hockey Database
NHL.com
hockey-reference

 
1985–86 in Canadian ice hockey by league
1985–86 in American ice hockey by league